Ryan Green is a Welsh football defender.

Ryan Green or Greene may also refer to:

Ryan Green (singer), participant of The Voice UK, series 3
Ryan Speedo Green (born 1986), American bass-baritone opera singer
Ryan Greene, American record producer
Ryan Scott Greene (born 1973), Canadian actor

See also
Brent Ryan Green, American film director and producer